Rebellion is an EP by Swiss heavy metal band Samael.

Track listing
"Rebellion"
"After the Sepulture" [New Version]
"I Love the Dead" (Alice Cooper cover)
"Static Journey" (instrumental)
"Into the Pentagram" [New Version]
Unlisted hidden track featuring two compositions: an electronic instrumental outro and a version of "Static Journey" with German vocals

1995 EPs
Samael (band) albums
Century Media Records EPs